D97  may refer to:
 HMS Corunna (D97)
 HMS Biter (D97)
 HMS Edinburgh (D97)
 Greek destroyer Hydra (D97)